Myrmarachne ramunni is a species of spiders of the genus Myrmarachne. It is native to India, Pakistan and Sri Lanka.

References

Spiders described in 1915
Salticidae
Invertebrates of Pakistan
Arthropods of India
Spiders of Asia